Overload is a 2005 album by the Canadian hard rock band Harem Scarem. It is the tenth Harem Scarem studio album. The Japanese version contains the song "You Shook Me All Night Long" (AC/DC cover) as a bonus track, while the European CD comes with "Wishing" which was previously released on the Japanese version of Higher.

Track listing 

Japanese version bonus track
"You Shook Me All Night Long"

Band members
Harry Hess - lead vocals, guitar, producer
Pete Lesperance - lead guitar, backing vocals, producer
Barry Donaghy - bass, backing vocals
Creighton Doane - drums, backing vocals

References 

2005 albums
Harem Scarem albums
Frontiers Records albums